Weightlifting at the 2003 Southeast Asian Games was held in the Soc Son Gymnasium, Hanoi, Vietnam.

Events
13 sets of medals were awarded in the following events:

Medal summary

Medal table

Men's events

Women's events

External links
Southeast Asian Games Official Results

2003 Southeast Asian Games events
2003 in weightlifting
2003
Weightlifting in Vietnam